Red Riding Hood is a 2011 American romantic horror film directed by Catherine Hardwicke, and produced by Leonardo DiCaprio, from a screenplay by David Leslie Johnson. The film is very loosely based on the folk tale "Little Red Riding Hood" collected by both Charles Perrault under the name Le Petit Chaperon Rouge (Little Red Riding Hood) and several decades later by the Brothers Grimm as Rotkäppchen (Little Red Cap). It stars Amanda Seyfried as the title role, with Gary Oldman, Billy Burke, Shiloh Fernandez, Max Irons, Virginia Madsen, Lukas Haas and Julie Christie in supporting roles.

Red Riding Hood had its world premiere at Hollywood on March 7, 2011, and was theatrically released on March 11, 2011, by Warner Bros. Pictures. The film received generally negative reviews from critics, with praise for Seyfried's performance but criticism for its plot. It grossed over $89 million worldwide against a $42 million budget.

Plot
Valerie lives with her parents, Cesaire and Suzette, and older sister Lucie in the village of Daggerhorn, on the edge of a forest plagued by a werewolf. She is in love with the woodcutter and childhood friend Peter, but her parents arrange for her to marry Henry, son of the wealthy blacksmith Adrien Lazar. Valerie and Peter plan to elope, only to learn the Wolf has broken its truce not to prey on the townspeople and murdered Lucie.

The preacher Father Auguste calls upon the famous witch hunter Father Solomon for help, but the townspeople decide to venture into the Wolf's lair. As the village celebrates, Father Solomon declares that the slain animal is a common grey wolf, as the true werewolf would have reverted to human form. Father Solomon's men isolate Daggerhorn and investigate the villagers to find out the Wolf's identity. That night, the Wolf attacks, and the townspeople shelter in the church while Valerie and her friend Roxanne search for Roxanne's autistic brother, Claude. Cornered by the beast, Valerie discovers she is able to understand the Wolf, who threatens to kill Roxanne and destroy the village if Valerie does not leave with him. The Wolf escapes, vowing to return for Valerie's decision.

The next day, Claude is captured and killed by Father Solomon's men for supposedly practicing black magic. Roxanne reveals that Valerie is able to communicate with the Wolf. Believing Valerie is also a witch, Father Solomon displays her in the town square to lure the Wolf. Henry and Peter help Valerie escape. Henry brings Valerie to the church, where the Wolf bites off Father Solomon's hand with silver-coated fingernails. The villagers shield Valerie from the Wolf, who is again forced to flee after burning its right paw on the church's holy ground. Since Father Solomon has been bitten by the Wolf, the Captain has no choice but to kill him.

Valerie dreams that the Wolf is her grandmother, and rushes to her nearby cabin, where she finds her grandmother dead and discovers that her father, Cesaire, is the Wolf. He reveals the curse was passed to him by his own father and he intended to leave the village with his children, having killed Lucie after realizing she could not understand him in wolf form and realizing Suzette had conceived her through an affair with  Adrien. He asks Valerie to accept the curse, but she refuses. Peter appears and Cesaire bites him and throws him aside. Peter throws an axe into Cesaire's back, allowing Valerie to kill her father. Valerie and Peter fill Cesaire's body with rocks and dump him in the lake in order to protect the secret from the villagers. Peter departs, vowing to return when he has learned to control the curse. Valerie says she will wait for him, and watches him depart.

In the next few years, Daggerhorn returns to normal; despite Cesaire's death, the people continue to sacrifice livestock to the werewolf, fearful of its return and not knowing it has been killed, while Suzette realizes Cesaire is never coming back, though she remains unaware that Valerie killed him. Henry becomes the next witch hunter, succeeding Father Solomon and becoming a highly honorable man, while Valerie chooses to live in the forest on her own, having become disillusioned with living in Daggerhorn. Finally, one night, Valerie hears something in the woods outside her grandmother's former house that she has moved into. She is then greeted by Peter, transformed into a werewolf and in full control of his abilities, when he returns to be with her. In the ending of the alternate cut, when Valerie sees Peter upon his return, she is holding their baby.

Cast

 Amanda Seyfried as Valerie
 Megan Charpentier as young Valerie
 Virginia Madsen as Suzette
 Billy Burke as Cesaire
 Julie Christie as Grandmother
 Shiloh Fernandez as Peter
 DJ Greenburg as young Peter
 Max Irons as Henry Lazar
 Gary Oldman as Father Solomon
 Michael Shanks as Adrien Lazar
 Christine Willes as Madame Lazar
 Adrian Holmes as the Captain
 Michael Hogan as The Reeve
 Lukas Haas as Father Auguste
 Alexandria Maillot as Lucie
 Shauna Kain as Roxanne
 Kacey Rohl as Prudence
 Carmen Lavigne as Rose
 Jennifer Halley as Marguerite
 Archie Rice as the voice of The Wolf

Production
Under Appian Way Productions, Leonardo DiCaprio, Michael Ireland, Jennifer Davisson Killoran, Alex Mace, and Julie Yorn produced the film. Early into production, the film was originally titled The Girl with the Red Riding Hood. Due to the fact that Seyfried did not like Fernandez based on a previous encounter at a dinner party, director Catherine Hardwicke had to persuade the actress to give the actor a chance. Principal photography took place in Vancouver from July 21 to September 16, 2010.

Release
The original release date, set for April 22, 2011, was moved to March 11, 2011. Red Riding Hood grossed $14,005,335 in ticket sales over the opening weekend, placing at number #3, behind Battle: Los Angeles and Rango. At the end of its run in 2011, the film grossed $37,662,162 in the United States and Canada, and grossed  $51,500,000 internationally for a worldwide total of $89,162,162.

Reception
Red Riding Hood has a 10% approval rating at review aggregator Rotten Tomatoes based on 208 reviews, with an average score of 3.75/10. The site's critical consensus reads, "Amanda Seyfried is magnetic in Red Riding Hoods starring role, but she's let down by her uninspired leading men and a painfully clichéd script." Metacritic calculated a score of 29 out of 100 based on the opinions of 36 critics, indicating "generally unfavorable reviews".

USA Today complimented the production design, but wrote that, "it's a foolish story, marred by a strange blend of overacting and bland, offhand performances." Roger Ebert gave the film one star out of four, stating it is "a movie that cross-pollinates the Twilight formula with a werewolf and a girl who always wears a red-hooded cape, although I don't recall her doing any riding... it has the added inconvenience of being serious about a plot so preposterous, it demands to be filmed by Monty Python."

Mary Pols of Time magazine named it one of the 10 worst films of 2011.

Marketing
The teaser trailer and the poster were released in November 2010, featuring "The Wolf", a new song written exclusively for the film by Swedish act Fever Ray.

The second trailer was released in January 2011, featuring "The Hand That Feeds" by Nine Inch Nails.

The novelization by Sarah Blakley-Cartwright received criticism for not including the story's final, concluding chapter, which instead was only made available for download online following the release of the film.

Soundtrack

 "Towers of the Void" – Brian Reitzell
 "Kids" – Brian Reitzell and Alex Heffes
 "Dead Sister" – Brian Reitzell and Alex Heffes
 "The Wolf" – Fever Ray
 "Mt. Grimoor" – Brian Reitzell and Alex Heffes
 "Tavern Stalker" – Brian Reitzell and Alex Heffes
 "Grandma’s House" – Brian Reitzell and Alex Heffes
 "Keep the Streets Empty for Me" – Fever Ray
 "Wolf Attack" – Brian Reitzell and Alex Heffes
 "Just a Fragment of You" – Anthony Gonzalez from M83 and Brian Reitzell
 "The Reveal" – Brian Reitzell and Alex Heffes
 "Finale" – Brian Reitzell and Alex Heffes
 "Crystal Visions" – The Big Pink

Some additional songs from the film are not featured on the official soundtrack:
 "Fire Walking" – Anthony Gonzalez and Brian Reitzell
 "Let’s Start an Orchestra" – Ken Andrews and Brian Reitzell
 "Ozu Choral" – Brian Reitzell
 "Piano Study No. 1 (Symphonic)" – Brian Reitzell

References

External links
 
 
 
  
 
 
 

2011 films
2011 horror films
2010s romantic fantasy films
Appian Way Productions films
Supernatural fantasy films
American supernatural horror films
American dark fantasy films
Films about families
Films based on Little Red Riding Hood
Films directed by Catherine Hardwicke
Films produced by Leonardo DiCaprio
Films scored by Alex Heffes
Films set in Europe
Films set in the Middle Ages
Matricide in fiction
American romantic horror films
Patricide in fiction
Uxoricide in fiction
Warner Bros. films
American werewolf films
Films with screenplays by David Leslie Johnson-McGoldrick
Films shot in Vancouver
2010s English-language films
2010s American films